Ancistrocerus campestris is a species of potter wasp. Quickly identified by the coloration on the rear of its thorax which is reminiscent of a smiley face. Preys on the caterpillars of Amphisbatidae and Gelechiidae.

References

Hymenoptera of North America
Potter wasps
Insects described in 1853
Taxa named by Henri Louis Frédéric de Saussure